Mirza Bzhalava (born 5 February 1988) is a Georgian former professional footballer.

Club career
On 31 January 2016, Bzhalava signed with SC Tisis, moving from Lustenau 07 where he had played for a year. He returned to Lustenau 07 two years later, before ending his football career with FC Schwarzach in 2019.

International career
Bzhalava gained one cap for the Georgia national football team.

References

External links
 

1988 births
Living people
Footballers from Georgia (country)
Expatriate footballers from Georgia (country)
Georgia (country) international footballers
SC Austria Lustenau players
Expatriate footballers in Austria
Association football midfielders
Expatriate sportspeople from Georgia (country) in Austria
Georgia (country) under-21 international footballers
FC Ameri Tbilisi players
FC Zestafoni players
SW Bregenz players
FC Lustenau players